Giancarlo Carlos (Martinez) Alvarado  (born January 24, 1978) is a professional baseball pitcher. He was raised in Camuy, Puerto Rico. He has played in the Chinese Professional Baseball League and Nippon Professional Baseball as well as in international competitions with the Puerto Rico national baseball team.

Career
Alvarado was signed as an undrafted free agent by the Pittsburgh Pirates in 1995 and made his professional baseball debut with the rookie class Gulf Coast Pirates that same year. After two seasons in the Gulf Coast League, he was promoted to the Class-A Augusta GreenJackets in 1997. He remained in the Pirates system through 2001, playing with the Lynchburg Hillcats and AA Altoona Curve. He also played in the Puerto Rico League in the winter of 2001.

Alvarado left the Pirates organization as a free agent in 2002 and played for the High Desert Mavericks in the Milwaukee Brewers organization in 2002 and the Lakeland Tigers and Erie SeaWolves in the Detroit Tigers organization in 2003.

Unable to land a job in the affiliated minors after the 2003 season, Alvarado pitched for the independent Lancaster Barnstormers and Newark Bears, the Macoto Cobras in Taiwan and a couple of Mexican League teams during 2004–2005.

The Cincinnati Reds picked Alvarado up for 2005 and assigned him to the AA Chattanooga Lookouts. He also pitched for the Puerto Rico team in the Olympic Qualifying series and for Gigantes de Carolina in the 2007 Caribbean Series.

In 2007, Alvarado pitched for Saltillo Saraperos in Mexico and in 2008 for the Salt Lake Bees in the Los Angeles Angels of Anaheim system, his first appearance at the AAA level. His 131 strikeouts for the Bees were third in the Pacific Coast League.

After the season, Alvarado pitched for the Uni-President 7-Eleven Lions in the Taiwan Series and the 2008 Asia Series. He then pitched for Puerto Rico in the 2009 Caribbean Series and the 2009 World Baseball Classic.

Alvarado signed a minor league contract with the Los Angeles Dodgers for the 2009 season and remained in the rotation for the AAA Albuquerque Isotopes for the entire season, finishing with a 13–10 record and a 3.49 ERA in 27 appearances.

In 2009–10 off season, Alvarado signed with Japan's Central League side Hiroshima Toyo Carp.

Alvarado competed in the 2013 World Baseball Classic for the Puerto Rican national baseball team. Prior to the tournament, he signed a minor league contract with the Colorado Rockies.

Alvarado signed a minor league contract with the New York Mets Organization on June 6, 2013 and was being assigned to the Las Vegas 51s, their AAA team.

References

External links

 Giancarlo Alvarado on "MILB.com"

1978 births
Living people
Albuquerque Isotopes players
Altoona Curve players
Augusta GreenJackets players
Chattanooga Lookouts players
Diablos Rojos del México players
Erie SeaWolves players
Puerto Rican expatriate baseball players in Taiwan
Gulf Coast Pirates players
High Desert Mavericks players
Hiroshima Toyo Carp players
Lakeland Tigers players
Lancaster Barnstormers players
Langosteros de Cancún players
Las Vegas 51s players
Leones de Ponce players
Louisville Bats players
Lynchburg Hillcats players
Macoto Cobras players
Mexican League baseball pitchers
Newark Bears players
Nippon Professional Baseball pitchers
Puerto Rican expatriate baseball players in Mexico
Puerto Rican expatriate baseball players in Japan
People from Camuy, Puerto Rico
People from Santurce, Puerto Rico
Salt Lake Bees players
San Angelo Colts players
Saraperos de Saltillo players
Sarasota Reds players
Tomateros de Culiacán players
Uni-President 7-Eleven Lions players
Yokohama DeNA BayStars players
2009 World Baseball Classic players
2013 World Baseball Classic players